The 2003 Dehradun Municipal Corporation election was a municipal election to the Dehradun Municipal Corporation, which governs Dehradun, the largest city in Uttarakhand.

References

External links
 Official Website of the Dehradun Municipal Corporation
 Kanwali Ward Map 
 Kanwali Ward Voter List

Dehradun Municipal Corporation
Dehradun
Local elections in Uttarakhand
2003 elections in India